An Agricultural Testament is Sir Albert Howard's best-known publication, and remains one of the seminal works in the history of organic farming agricultural movement. Dedicated to his first wife and co-worker Gabrielle, herself a plant physiologist, it focuses on the nature and management of soil fertility, and notably explores composting. At a time when modern, chemical-based industrialized agriculture was just beginning to radically alter food production, it advocated natural processes rather than man-made inputs as the superior approach to farming. It was first published in England in 1940, with the first American edition in 1943.

Notes

References

External links
An Agricultural Testament - full text online
An Agricultural Testament - 2010 Edition published by Benediction Classics

1940 non-fiction books
Agriculture books
Composting